Countess of Snowdon may refer to:

 Princess Margaret, Countess of Snowdon (1930–2002), younger daughter of King George VI and first wife of Antony Armstrong-Jones, 1st Earl of Snowdon
 Lucy Armstrong-Jones, Countess of Snowdon (b. 1941), second wife of Antony Armstrong-Jones, 1st Earl of Snowdon
 Serena Armstrong-Jones, Countess of Snowdon (b. 1970), wife of David Armstrong-Jones, 2nd Earl of Snowdon

See also 
 Earl of Snowdon